Addition Financial Credit Union (Addition Financial) is a state-chartered credit union headquartered in Lake Mary, Florida. The credit union is a member-owned, not-for-profit financial cooperative with 26 branches in six counties, with its field of membership currently open to 24 counties in Florida.

History 
Addition Financial was founded in 1937 by a group of 23 educators who aimed to create a better financial alternative to what the banks were offering. When it was first established, the credit union was named Orange County Teachers Federal Credit Union, as it served educators in Orange County Public Schools at that time. Over the years, the credit union changed its name to Central Florida Educators Federal Credit Union, then shortened its name to CFE Federal Credit Union, as it broadened its field of membership to a community charter and began to serve consumers in Seminole, Lake and Osceola counties.

In 2011, the credit union (then CFE Federal Credit Union) acquired UCF Federal Credit Union, which bolstered its presence in the higher education community and at the University of Central Florida. In 2015, CFE acquired Seminole Schools Federal Credit Union.

In 2019, in order to expand outside of the realm of education and eliminate confusion surrounding who was eligible to join, CFE changed its name to Addition Financial Credit Union. This name change also marked a change in charter, as the credit union converted from a federal to a state charter. Through this rebranding, Addition Financial's field of membership expanded from four to 22 counties in Florida. As of January 2022, the field of membership includes 24 counties in Florida.

Also in 2019, Addition Financial was one of the first credit unions in the state of Florida to purchase a bank. In August of that year, the credit union acquired Fidelity Bank of Florida, a commercial bank based in Merritt Island, thus expanding its footprint to Brevard County.

Products and services 
Addition Financial holds a 5-star rating from Bauer Financial, the nation's leading bank and credit union rating service. This rating evaluates the strength and security of financial institutions throughout the United States.

The credit union offers a range of consumer and business products, including checking and savings accounts, loans, mortgages and investment services. In addition, the company provides specific products designed for educators. Addition Financial offers co-branded affinity debit cards, donating a portion of interchange income to benefit education-based organizations including Orange County Public Schools, Seminole County Public Schools, Osceola School District and UCF Athletics. The credit union also offers a deferred option savings account product to help educators who only receive a paycheck for part of the year to save year-round.

Community outreach and education 
Addition Financial participates in several community outreach activities and initiatives that relate to their background in education. In 2008, Addition Financial opened its first student-run high school branch at Timber Creek High School. This program has expanded to serve nine high schools across Orange, Seminole and Osceola counties.

In 2013, Addition Financial (then CFE Federal Credit Union) acquired the naming rights for the UCF Arena, a sports and entertainment venue in Orlando, and was named the official financial institution of the UCF Knights. When the credit union changed its name in 2019, the arena was renamed the Addition Financial Arena. On August 18, 2022, UCF announced that Addition Financial had extended their naming rights for the facility through 2034. 

In 2014, Addition Financial became the preferred credit union of Seminole State College of Florida, and was named the preferred credit union of Valencia College in 2018. Through its college and university partnerships, Addition Financial offers on-campus ATMs, financial education workshops, scholarships, event sponsorships and other support for students, faculty and staff. In 2016, Addition Financial was the second company to pledge its support to the new UCF Downtown Campus, pledging $1.5 million. Through this donation, the credit union holds the naming rights to the campus library.

The credit union partners regularly with education-focused non-profit organizations, such as A Gift For Teaching, and maintains close ties with Orange County Public Schools, Seminole County Public Schools, Lake County Public Schools and Osceola School District. In 2018, Addition Financial launched its Renovate to Educate Contest, selecting public school teachers from its partner school districts to receive a classroom makeover, designed by Interior Design interns from Seminole State College. The credit union continued the program in 2019, but had to postpone the classroom renovations for the 2020 winners due to COVID-19.

Addition Financial also provides scholarships through its annual Joseph A. Melbourne Jr. Scholarship Program. Each year, the credit union offers scholarships for six high school seniors in Florida and two UCF graduate students.

Addition Financial offers free financial education workshops both in person and virtually for its community partners. The credit union also provides free webinars and seminars, financial education blogs and the Making It Count podcast, which focuses on various topics surrounding money management. In addition, the credit union has recently launched The Advisor, a monthly newsletter round-up of all community events, educational content and promotions taking place within the organization.

In March 2020, Addition Financial also launched the On The + Side blog series to help community members cope with the challenges of the COVID-19 pandemic.

Addition Financial has been recognized for its community outreach. In 2019, Addition Financial received the Corporate Philanthropy Award from Orlando Business Journal. In recent years, the credit union has also been recognized with the UCF Partnership Award, the Harvey Milk Diversity in Business Award and the Seminole Business Award.

References 

Credit unions based in Florida